Aksyon JournalisMO, roughly translated as "Action: Your Journalism" (JournalisMO is a portmanteau of journalismo and mo, Filipino words meaning journalism and your, respectively), was the flagship late night news program broadcast by TV5. Originally anchored by Martin Andanar, Cherie Mercado, and Jove Francisco, it premiered on October 25, 2010, replacing TEN: The Evening News. Simulcast on AksyonTV and on the radio through 92.3 News FM in Mega Manila, the program is broadcast Monday to Friday from 10:45 p.m. to 11:15 p.m. (PST). The newscast is based on News5's Facebook fan page JournalisMO. In JournalisMO, citizens can express their opinions on the different issues of the country. Paolo Bediones, Mercado, and Francisco served as the final anchors. The show concluded on February 17, 2012, and was replaced by Pilipinas News.

About the show
The news magazine program premiered on October 25, 2010, at 11:00pm. Co-anchoring it were Cherie Mercado, Martin Andanar, and Jove Francisco, all transferees from Aksyon Weekend. Andanar eventually left the show on February 14, 2011, to anchor his own TV version of Andar ng mga Balita on AksyonTV. Since no replacements was yet to be named for him, Atty. Mike Templo became his sit-in anchor, finishing the departed anchor's four remaining episodes. Paolo Bediones, who recently left Aksyon, was named as Andanar's permanent replacement on February 21, 2011.

SideTracked, a segment where Francisco presents World Wide Web news alongside reactions of viewers posted online, was revived in this newscast after being with Sentro and TEN: The Evening News.

Anchors

Final Anchors
Paolo Bediones (2011–2012)
Cherie Mercado (2010–2012)
Jove Francisco (2010–2012; Side TRACKED Segment Host)
Manu Sandejas  (2011–2012; Aksyon Weather Segment Anchor)
Claudine Trillo (2011–2012; Aksyon Weather Segment Anchor)
Lou Garcia   (2011–2012; Showbiz Eklavu Segment Anchor)

Former anchor
Martin Andanar (2010–2011)

See also
News5
List of programs aired by TV5 (Philippine TV network)
List of programs aired by AksyonTV/5 Plus

External links 

Program Site

TV5 (Philippine TV network) news shows
Philippine television news shows
TV5 (Philippine TV network) original programming
2010 Philippine television series debuts
2012 Philippine television series endings
Filipino-language television shows